Hadena confusa, the marbled coronet, is a species of moth of the family Noctuidae. It is found in Europe, North Africa and West Asia and Central Asia.

Description

The wingspan is 27–35 mm. The forewing ground colour is purplish fuscous tinged with olive grey. The stigmata are fused together forming a large white patch and there is a small white apical blotch. The subterminal line is white in colour and irregular wavy and joins the apical white stain. The basal field shows a more or less pronounced whitening. The fringe is chequered. The hindwings are fuscous with a small discal lunule and white fringe. The hindwings are slightly darker on the outside In very humid areas melanistic individuals can occur primarily in the Shetland and Orkney Islands, parts of the Hebrides, as well as in Wales and Scotland.

Biology
The moth flies from May to July and sometimes from August to September in a second generation depending on the location.

The larvae feed on Dianthus and Silene species, such as Silene nutans and Silene vulgaris.

Subspecies
Hadena confusa confusa
Hadena confusa herczigi
Hadena confusa iliensis

References

External links

Fauna Europaea
Lepiforum
www.schmetterlinge-deutschlands.de 
www.nic.funet.fi 
UK Moths
Noctuidae.de

Hadena
Moths described in 1766
Moths of Africa
Moths of Asia
Moths of Europe
Taxa named by Johann Siegfried Hufnagel